María José Mata (born 3 December 1994) is a Mexican swimmer. She competed in the women's 200 metre butterfly event at the 2017 World Aquatics Championships.

References

1994 births
Living people
Mexican female swimmers
Place of birth missing (living people)
Female butterfly swimmers
21st-century Mexican women